Brazilian Uruguayans (Portuguese: Uruguaios Brasileiros) are people born in Brazil who live in Uruguay, or Uruguayan-born people of Brazilian descent.

History
Many Brazilian-born people live in Uruguay, for a number of reasons. Above all, the frontier, which is one of the most permeable in the world; the neighboring cities of Rivera and Santana do Livramento, as a matter of fact, function closely as if they were a single big city. Then the languages spoken in both countries are mutually intelligible, with a hybrid variant, the Riverense Portuñol language. Historical reasons are also important: when the Southern Cone was disputed between the Spanish and Portuguese empires, a good portion of the territory of modern Uruguay changed hands several times. And, shortly before Uruguay was born as an independent nation, it was annexed to Brazil with the name of Cisplatine Province. Last, but not least, slavery was abolished early in Uruguay but persisted in Brazil for decades to come, so many Afro-Brazilian slaves escaped to Uruguay.

Present
The 2011 Uruguayan census revealed 12,882 people who declared Brazil as their country of birth. As of 2013, there are over 1,600 Brazilian workers registered in the Uruguayan social security. Among schoolchildren born abroad, Brazilians are one of the most important groups, among 62 countries that are represented in Uruguayan schools.

Well-off Brazilians are increasingly choosing the international seaside resort Punta del Este to spend their summer holidays, some of them even as permanent residence.

There is a Uruguayan-Brazilian Cultural Institute in the center of Montevideo.

Notable people
Past
Irineu Evangelista de Sousa (1813-1889), locally known as Baron of Mauá, Brazilian businessman and banker
Aparicio Saravia (1856-1904), political leader, born in Uruguay to Brazilian parents
Present
André Nunes (born 1984), Brazilian footballer in Cerro Largo
Fabián Coelho (born 1977), footballer
Felipe Carvalho (born 1993), footballer
Carlos Diogo (born 1983), footballer
Víctor Diogo (born 1958), footballer
Ronald Araújo (born 1999), footballer for FC Barcelona

See also
Brazil–Uruguay relations
Uruguayan immigration to Brazil

References

Immigration to Uruguay
Ethnic groups in Uruguay
 
Uruguay